Xiangqi at the 2007 Asian Indoor Games was held in Macau International Shooting Range, Macau, China from 27 October to 30 October 2007.

Medalists

Medal table

Results

Men's individual rapid
27–29 October

Men's individual standard
27–30 October

Men's team standard
27–30 October

Women's individual standard
27–30 October

 Ngô Lan Hương of Vietnam tied with Chen Lichun in score but defeated the latter by one extra black-win to seize the gold medal.

References
 Xiangqi database

2007
2007 Asian Indoor Games events
Xiangqi competitions